Cesano Maderno is a railway station in Italy. Located at the crossing of the Milan–Asso and Saronno–Seregno railways, it serves the town of Cesano Maderno.

Services
Cesano Maderno is located on two levels: Milan suburban railway network lines S2 and S4 use the lower level, as do regional trains between Asso and Milan, while line S9 stops on the upper level. All services are operated by the Lombard railway company Trenord.

See also
 Milan suburban railway network

References

External links

Railway stations in Lombardy
Milan S Lines stations
Railway stations opened in 2011